Hasanabad (also Romanized as Ḩasanābād; also known as ’asanābād) is a village in Negar Rural District, in the Central District of Bardsir County, Kerman Province, Iran. At the 2006 census, its population was 131, in 28 families.

References 

Populated places in Bardsir County